Hirtocossus is a genus of moths of the family Cossidae from Madagascar.

Type species:  Hirtocossus cirrilator  (Le Cerf, 1919)

Species
Hirtocossus cirrilator  (Le Cerf, 1919)
Hirtocossus crucis (Kenrick, 1914)

References

Cossinae
Glossata genera
Moths of Africa